Economic Partnership Agreements (EPAs) are a scheme to create a free trade area (FTA) between the European Union and other countries. They are a response to continuing criticism that the non-reciprocal and discriminating preferential trade agreements offered by the EU are incompatible with WTO rules. The EPAs date back to the signing of the Cotonou Agreement. The EPAs with the different regions are at different states of play. The EU has signed EPAs with the following countries: the Southern African Development Community (SADC), ECOWAS (16 states), six countries in Eastern and Southern Africa, Cameroon, four Pacific states, and the CARIFORUM states. Their defining characteristic is that they open up exports to the EU immediately, while exports to the partner regions is opened up only partially and over transitioning periods.

There is also an EU-Japan EPA, which is however symmetrical in opening markets, and thus only an EPA in name.

Key elements

Reciprocity
Due to the continuing WTO incompatibility of previous arrangements, the EPAs' key feature is their reciprocity and their non-discriminatory nature. They involve the phased out removal of all trade preferences which have been established between the EU and the ACP countries since 1975 as well as the progressive removal of trade barriers between the partners. In order to fulfil the criterion of being a non-discriminatory agreement, the EPAs are open to all developing countries, thereby effectively terminating the ACP group as the main development partner of the EU.

The establishment of a reciprocal trade agreement confronts the EU with the problem of how to reconcile the special status of the ACP group with the EU's obligations to the WTO. The solution proposed for this dilemma is an agreement which is only as reciprocal as necessary to fulfil WTO criteria. In reality, the ACP countries will have some room to manoeuvre and to maintain some limited protection of their most vital products. The extent to which trade must be liberalised under the new EPAs is still a widely debated issue and it remains to be seen whether the WTO provisions regulating regional trade agreements will be revised in favour of the EPA scheme at the end of the Doha Round.

Regionalism
True to the Cotonou principle of differentiation and regionalisation the developing countries are encouraged to enter into the EPAs in regional groupings. So far the ACP countries have formed seven  regional groupings in which they intend to enter into EPAs with the European Union. These regional groupings are
the Economic Community of West African States
the Economic and Monetary Community of Central Africa
the Southern African Development Community
 the East African Community
 the Eastern and Southern Africa (ESA)
the Caribbean Community + Dominican Republic (CARIFORUM)
the Pacific region.

Special treatment
The new regional grouping established due to the EPA scheme causes the problem of how to reconcile this approach with the previous special treatment of the group of least developed countries (LDCs) among the ACP countries. Currently, 40 of the 79 ACP countries are defined as LDCs by the United Nations. The LDCs constitute a special group among the developing countries and have usually been treated separately.

Therefore, the EPAs will provide special arrangements for this particular group. As opposed to the other ACP countries, the group of LDCs will be invited to reject the EPAs and continue trade relations under the "Everything But Arms" (EBA) regulation. Launched in 2001 by the Council of Ministers, this amendment to the EC's Generalized System of Preferences has since then regulated the trade relations between the EU and the LDCs that have chosen to use this facility, granting duty-free access to all products from LDCs without any quantitative restrictions – except to arms and munitions. While this provision facilitates the situation of the LDCs under the new trade scheme, it has also been criticised because the EBA initiative prevents LDCs from opening up their markets for EU products within the context of an EPA. Another weakness of the EBA initiative is that it utilises the rules of origin of the GSP which require double stage transformation for textiles and clothing. The rules of origin of the EPAs on the other hand allows single stage transformation for the exports of these sectors. This is one of the reasons why Mozambique and Lesotho (both LDCs) initialled the SADC EU Interim EPA in November 2007, and then went on to sign this agreement in July 2009. Angola (the other LDC in the SADC EPA configuration) has chosen to continue trading under EBA as their main exports to the EU are oil and diamonds which as 'wholly obtained' originating products enjoy duty and quota free entry under the EBA rules of origin.

Predicted impact
Researchers at the Overseas Development Institute predict the impact of the EPAs, however, to be rather minimal. Because most African, Caribbean and Pacific (ACP) group states already enjoyed duty and tariff free access of about €1.4 billion from the Cotonou Agreement that expired in 2007, there was little new that could be offered. The expected impact described by the ODI:
 The transfer of the import tax levied by the EU (€12.7 million in 2006) to parts of the ACP export supply chain, making exports more profitable.
 Accrued revenue transfer could induce ACP members to increase levels of trade between each other and increase their supply of competitive products without substantial new investment.
 Removing tariff barriers may make it economically feasible to export additional products to the EU that are already exported to other markets.
 The most significant, but not necessarily most likely effect, is that there could be increases in foreign exchange earning and positive effects for the rest of the economy.

See also

 Free trade area
 List of free trade agreements
 List of bilateral free trade agreements
ACP-EU Development Cooperation
Cotonou Agreement
Lomé Convention
ACP-EU Joint Parliamentary Assembly
 The Courier (ACP-EU) - The magazine of Africa-Caribbean-Pacific and European Union cooperation and relations
 Common Agricultural Policy - agricultural policy of the European Union

References

Further reading
Bilal, S; Rampa, F. (2006). Alternative (to) EPAs. Possible scenarios for the future ACP trade relations with the EU (ECDPM Policy Management Report 11). Maastricht: ECDPM. Retrieved June 9, 2006, from www.ecdpm.org
ECDPM. 2002. Cotonou Infokit. Maastricht: ECDPM. Retrieved June 8, 2006 from www.ecdpm.org
Giesbert, L; Pfeiffer, B.; Schotte, S (2016): Economic Partnership Agreements with the EU: Trade-Offs for Africa. GIGA Focus Africa 7–2016, retrieved 21 December 2016 from www.giga-hamburg.de.
Gillson, I; Grimm, S. (2004). European development cooperation to 2010. EU trade partnerships with developing countries. London: Overseas Development Institute. Retrieved June 10, 2006, from www.odi.org.uk
Jessop, David. Understanding the EPA: cultural services. The possibilities for CARIFORUM regarding the agreement involving culture under the EPA. Understanding the EPA: cultural services (in English), Retrieved on 15 December 2008.
Jessop, David. Governing the EPA (2008-10-12). "Governing the EPA" (in English), The Jamaica Gleaner Newspaper. Retrieved on 15 December 2008.
Stevens, C; Kennan, J. (2005). EU-ACP Economic Partnership Agreements: the effects of reciprocity. Sussex: Institute of Development Studies Retrieved on June 19, 2006, from www.thecommonwealth.org
TY. Think twice about EPA, says Marshall (2008-04-23). "Think twice about EPA, says Marshall" (in English), The Barbados Daily Nation Newspaper. Retrieved on 16 November 2013.

External links
Slamming the Door on Development: Analysis of the EU’s response to the Pacific’s EPA negotiating proposals
European Centre for Development Policy Management
Partnership under Pressure - an assessment of the EU's conduct in the EPA negotiations
ACP-EU trade website
Agritrade policy analysis of ACP-EU trade issues
EU déjà vu in the Caribbean
"Everything But Arms" Regulation
Euforic makes information on Europe's development cooperation more accessible
Economic Partnership Agreements briefing from Transnational Institute
Deal on Economic Partnership Agreements expected at ACP-EU talks EUX.TV
The European Union's Agreements with the Group of African, Caribbean and Pacific countries

Treaties entered into by the European Union
Foreign relations of the Caribbean
Trade blocs
Proposed treaties
Organisation of African, Caribbean and Pacific States